Cycling at the 2010 Summer Youth Olympics was held from 17 to 22 August. The event took place at The Float at Marina Bay for the road cycling and at Tampines Bike Park for the BMX and mountain biking.

Format
There was one event held, a combined mixed-gender team event with sub-events in the disciplines of Bicycle Motocross (BMX), road cycling and mountain biking. Each team consisted of three boys and one girl, with the three boys required to compete in one discipline each (BMX, MTB and road time trial) while the girl had to compete in all three disciplines. All male riders also had to compete in the road race.

Qualification
The qualification system for the Youth Olympic Games is principally based on two sets of criteria, related to endurance and performance.
 The first (endurance) is calculated based on the final ranking of the 2009 UCI Juniors Nations Cup.
 The second (performance) is calculated based on the nations ranking for the UCI Mountain Bike and BMX World Championships for the 2009 season.

It is therefore obviously vital for the athletes to compete in these events, where their results could enable them to qualify the country for the Singapore Youth Olympic Games.

Endurance criteria
2009 UCI Juniors Nations' Cup

Performance Criteria
UCI BMX World Championships
 
UCI Mountain Bike World Championships

Schedule

Medalists

References

 
2010 Summer Youth Olympics events
Youth Olympics 2010
Olympics
2010
2010 in road cycling
2010 in BMX
2010 in mountain biking
International cycle races hosted by Singapore